The Ministry of Youth and Sports of Ghana is the government agency responsible for youth empowerment and sports development.

Agencies under the Ministry
The mandate of the National Sports Council is to function as an umbrella organization under which various sports association operate. It was formed in 1976. The council develops, organizes and manages competitive and non-competitive sports to promote national cohesion and professionalism in various Ghanaian activities. The National Youth Council is a government agency established in 1974 to organize and promote youth development programmes in the country.

The National Sports College was built in 1984 in Winneba in the Central region. The college was established by the Provisional National Defence Council (PNDC) government to promote various sporting disciplines to international levels. At the college's establishment Ghanaian sportsmen were not performing as expected at international competitions. A reason for the college's establishment was to improve the competitiveness of sportsmen in the country. The function of the college is to train and re-train the country's technical and human resource in various sporting disciplines.

List of ministers

References

External links
 

Ghana
Sport in Ghana
Youth and Sports
Lists of government ministers of Ghana